USCGC Cayuga was a  of the United States Coast Guard launched on 7 October 1931 and commissioned on 22 March 1932. She was transferred to the Royal Navy where she served as HMS Totland (Y88), a  sloop from 1941 to 1946. After being returned to the USCG in 1946, she was recommissioned as USCGC Mocoma 20 March 1947.

Career

Coast Guard – Cayuga
Cayuga served the USCG for nine years in New London, Connecticut and was responsible for ice breaking in Buzzards Bay. On 5 April 1941, President Franklin D. Roosevelt transferred ten 250-foot cutters from the United States Coast Guard to the United Kingdom as part of the Lend-Lease Act.

Royal Navy – Totland
After being commissioned 12 May 1941, Totland sailed to England with convoy HX 128.  After a refit on the River Thames, Totland escorted convoys OS 4, SL 89, OS 12, SL 95, OS 17, SL 100, OS 22, SL 106, OS 28, SL 112, OS 40, and SL 124 with the 42nd Escort Group before being assigned to Operation Torch.  After escorting convoys KMF 3, MKF 3, KMF 5, MKF 5, KMF 7 and MKF 7 in support of the North African invasion, Totland sank  on 23 February 1943 while escorting the tanker convoys UC 1 and CU 1.  Totland then escorted convoys between Freetown and Lagos via Sekondi-Takoradi until transferred to the Kilindini Escort Force in July 1944.  Totland began a prolonged refit in October 1944 until the decision to retire her in May 1945.

Coast Guard – Mocoma
After service in the Royal Navy, she was returned to the USCG in 1946. After reconditioning, 20 March 1947 she was recommissioned as USCGC Mocoma (WPG-163) and was placed in service to be stationed in Miami, Florida where she remained until her decommissioning on 8 May 1950. She was later sold on 15 July 1955 to an unknown party.

See also
 List of United States Coast Guard cutters

References

1931 ships
Lake-class cutters
Ships built in Quincy, Massachusetts
World War II sloops of the United Kingdom
Banff-class sloops